Nuwan Priyadarshana (born 9 May 1993) is a Sri Lankan cricketer. He made his Twenty20 debut on 4 January 2020, for Galle Cricket Club in the 2019–20 SLC Twenty20 Tournament. He made his List A debut on 24 November 2021, for Galle Cricket Club in the 2021–22 Major Clubs Limited Over Tournament.

References

External links
 

1993 births
Living people
Sri Lankan cricketers
Galle Cricket Club cricketers
Place of birth missing (living people)